Jasper van der Werff (born 9 December 1998) is a Swiss professional footballer who plays as a centre-back for German  club SC Paderborn.

Club career
Van der Werff made his professional debut for St. Gallen in a 2–0 Swiss Super League win over FC Basel on 17 February 2018. In the summer of 2018 van der Werff transferred to RB Salzburg and he was loaned to FC Liefering.

On 9 January 2020, FC Basel announced that they had loan contracted van der Werff for one and a half seasons. After three test games van der Werff played his domestic league debut for his new club in the home game at the St. Jakob-Park on 2 February as Basel were defeated 2–1 by St. Gallen. He scored his first goal for the club on 21 January 2021 in the home game in the St. Jakob-Park against Lugano. It was the last goal of the game in the 89th minute and the equaliser as Basel managed a 2–2 draw.

Van der Werff left the club as the contract ended. During his 18 months with the club, Van der Werff played a total of 50 games for Basel scoring the afore mentioned one goal. 34 of these games were in the Swiss Super League, four in the Swiss Cup, five in the UEFA Europa League and seven were friendly games.

On 19 May 2022, van der Werff signed with SC Paderborn on a permanent basis after playing at the club on loan in the previous season.

International career
Van der Werff was born in Switzerland to Dutch parents who had moved to Speicher, Switzerland the previous year. He grew up in Speicher and represented the Switzerland U16 twice in 2014.

References

External links
 UEFA Profile
 
 SFL Profile
 
 

1998 births
Sportspeople from St. Gallen (city)
Living people
Swiss men's footballers
Association football defenders
Switzerland youth international footballers
Swiss people of Dutch descent
FC St. Gallen players
FC Red Bull Salzburg players
FC Liefering players
FC Basel players
SC Paderborn 07 players
Swiss Super League players
Austrian Football Bundesliga players
2. Liga (Austria) players
2. Bundesliga players
Swiss expatriate footballers
Swiss expatriate sportspeople in Austria
Expatriate footballers in Austria
Swiss expatriate sportspeople in Germany
Expatriate footballers in Germany